Aljaž Tepina, known as Aliash Tepina, is a Slovenian actor.

Tepina was born in Kranj. He studied acting at Central School of Speech and Drama in London. His professional career started with role in Slovenian TV Film Skriti spomin Angele Vode (2009). He also appeared in one episode of Law & Order: UK in 2009. His first major role was The Dark Knight Rises. He also played some short film roles.

Work

Film

Television

References

External links

Living people
Slovenian male film actors
Slovenian male television actors
People from Kranj
Year of birth missing (living people)
21st-century Slovenian male actors